{{Speciesbox
| image = ArionidesStgr1887MFUpUn.jpg
| image_caption = 'Phengaris arionides| status = LR/nt 
| status_system = IUCN2.3
| taxon = Phengaris arionides
| authority = (Staudinger, 1887)
| synonyms = Maculinea arionides (Staudinger, 1887)
|status_ref=
}}

The greater large blue (Phengaris arionides'') is a species of butterfly in the  family Lycaenidae.

It is found in Northeast China, Japan, and the Russian Far East.

References

Phengaris
Butterflies described in 1887
Taxonomy articles created by Polbot